Shagari may refer to:

Shagari, Nigeria, a Local Government Area in Sokoto State
Shehu Shagari (1925–2018), Nigerian president
Shagari Alleyne (born 1984), American basketballer
Bello Bala Shagari (born 1988), youth activist and filmmaker
Shagari Mohammed (born 1990), Nigerian footballer
Muhammad Bala Shagari (born 1949), District Head of Shagari Local Government, in Sokoto State
Muktar Shagari (born 1956), Nigerian Minister of Water Resources